Fernando Estévez Martín (born 1 June 1979) is a Spanish football manager, currently in charge of CD Eldense.

Career
Born in Capileira, Granada, Andalusia, Estévez began his managerial career with Vélez Rubio CF in 2004, in the Regional Preferente. After achieving promotion to Primera Andaluza in his first season, he left the club in 2006 to work as a doctor in Guadix.

Estévez returned to managerial duties in 2007, with Granada CF's reserves. He also led the side to Primera Andaluza in his first year, and took over Tercera División side Loja CD in July 2009.

Estévez achieved a first-ever promotion to Segunda División B with Loja in 2012, but departed the club on 31 May 2013, after their immediate relegation. On 30 June 2014, after a year without coaching, he was named in charge of CD Guijuelo in the third tier.

Estévez left Guijuelo at the end of the 2014–15 season, and was appointed UD Almería B manager on 23 December 2015, replacing Miguel Rivera. After suffering relegation, he left.

On 7 June 2017, Estévez was named at the helm of Marbella FC, still in division three. He left on 21 June 2018, and was appointed manager of fellow league team Burgos CF on 26 October.

Estévez was sacked by Burgos on 7 October 2019, and was named CD Badajoz manager roughly one year later. Despite finishing the 2020–21 campaign as the best team of the division, his side was unable to achieve promotion after losing the last round of the play-offs; on 2 July 2021, he left the club on a mutual agreement.

On 11 July 2022, after another year without a club, Estévez was appointed manager of CD Eldense in Primera Federación.

Personal life
Estévez is also an emergency doctor, and worked in that profession during the COVID-19 pandemic. His brother Miguel was a footballer; a midfielder, he never played in any higher than Tercera División, and both were together at Vélez Rubio.

References

External links

1979 births
Living people
Sportspeople from the Province of Granada
Spanish football managers
Primera Federación managers
Segunda División B managers
Tercera División managers
Club Recreativo Granada managers
Loja CD managers
CD Guijuelo managers
UD Almería B managers
Marbella FC managers
Burgos CF managers
CD Badajoz managers
CD Eldense managers